Arnstein Rynning Arneberg (6 July 1882 – 9 June 1961) was a Norwegian architect. He was active professionally for 50 years and is often considered the leading architect in Norway of his time.

Personal life
Arnstein Rynning Arneberg was born in Fredrikshald (now Halden) as a son of factory manager Mauritz Otto Edward Arneberg (1845–1913) and Hermione Nicoline Mathilde Rynning (1858–1944).  Arneberg grew up in Lysaker in Oslo.

In 1910 he married Aagot Kielland Skavlan (1888–1960), a daughter of professor Olaf Skavlan. After the marriage was dissolved in 1923 Arneberg married Eva Elisabeth Reimers (1901–1987). A daughter from the first marriage, ceramicist Gro Skavlan Arneberg, was married to economist and politician Egil Lothe.

Education
From 1899–1902, he was a student at the Royal Drawing School, now the Norwegian National Academy of Craft and Art Industry in Oslo. Arneberg began his education of the architect with employment as assistant to the architect, Alfred Christian Dahl (1857–1940) in Oslo from 1888–1900. Arneberg studied at the Royal Institute of Technology in Stockholm from 1904 to 1906. He also studied with Swedish architects Isak Gustaf Clason, Gustaf Lindgren, and Erik Lallerstedt. In Stockholm, he studied with a group of Norwegian architect students who came to be influential in the academic environment, including Magnus Poulsson.

Career
In 1908, Arneberg established  his own architectural practice. He and architect Ole Andreas Sverre (1865-1952) worked as partners on Arneberg's earliest works, including a proposal for the Royal Lodge (Kongsseteren) at Voksenkollen outside Oslo. As an independent architect, Arneberg's work included a large array of residences, office buildings, churches, railroad stations, and interiors.

He is most associated with his work on the Oslo City Hall (with Magnus Poulsson) and  interior design of the  UN Security Council in New York City.
The Viking Ship Museum in Bygdøy, built for the Oseberg ship was completed in 1926. He also worked on Skaugum, the official residence of the Crown Prince and Crown Princess of Norway.

Awards
Arneberg was one of the first recipients of the Medal of St. Hallvard in 1956 and was awarded the Prince Eugen Medal in 1960. He was named a Commander with Star of the Order of St. Olav and received the King Haakon VII's Jubilee Medal and the King Haakon VII's Commemorative Medal in gold. He was made a commander of the Order of the Polar Star and was elected a member of the Royal Swedish Academy of Arts in Stockholm.
 
The Østfold Architectural Association (ØAF) named the Arnstein Arneberg Prize (Arnstein Arnebergprisen) in his honor. The prize was first awarded for the 50-year anniversary of the ØAF in 2008.

Selected works
 Volda Church, Møre og Romsdal - 1929–32
 Viking Ship Museum (Oslo) - 1926–1932
 Uranienborg Church, Oslo (interior design) - 1930
 Akershus Castle (restored and rebuilt) - 1932–1948
The Royal Mausoleum - 1948
 Glemmen  Church, Fredrikstad - 1949
 Hamar Cathedral (extensive renovation) - 1954
 Park Hotel, Sandefjord - 1957–60
 Skjerstad Church,  Bodø - 1959
 Høyanger Church, Sogn og Fjordane - 1960

References

External links
United Nations Security Council Chamber
Viking Ship Museum
Skjerstad Church

1882 births
1961 deaths
People from Halden
People from Bærum
KTH Royal Institute of Technology alumni
Architects from Oslo
Commanders of the Order of the Polar Star
Recipients of the Prince Eugen Medal
Recipients of the St. Olav's Medal